Boy Slaves is a 1939 drama film starring Roger Daniel and Anne Shirley. The film was directed by P.J. Wolfson and based upon an Albert Bein story. Boy Slaves is an exposé of child labor.

Plot

Runaway boy Jesse Thompson, hoping to earn enough money to support his mother, follows a gang of other boys. After an infraction gets them all in trouble, they are forced to work in a fenced and guarded turpentine camp, climbing and tapping trees. They are free to leave only if they can first pay off bills they ran up at the company store (peonage). Trapped in a state of de facto slavery, they decide to strike for better food after one boy gets dizzy from hunger and falls from a tree, resulting in the amputation of his arm. When their protest fails, the boys decide to write a letter about the conditions of their detention to the U.S. President's wife, but it is intercepted. The boys believe one of their number is a "snitch", but later discover differently.

Cast
Anne Shirley - Annie
Roger Daniel - Jesse Thompson
James McCallion - Tim
Walter Ward - Miser
Charles Powers - Lollie
Johnny Fitzgerald - Knuckles
Frank Malo - Tommy
Paul White - Atlas
Walter Tetley - Pee Wee
Charles Lane - Albee
Arthur Hohl - Sheriff
Adrian Morris - State Policeman

See also
List of films featuring slavery

External links 
 

1939 films
American black-and-white films
RKO Pictures films
1939 drama films
American drama films
1930s American films